Clean is the second full-length studio album from industrial band Deitiphobia, released in 1994 by Myx Records. It is the earliest Deitiphobia album not to feature Brent Stackhouse, who left in 1992, and was also the band's debut for the Myx label. The album features Sheri Shaw, who remained with Deitiphobia until it dissolved in 2001, and Michael Knott, who produced Fear of the Digital Remix and was also the founder of the band's previous record label, Blonde Vinyl.

Track listing
All songs written and performed by Deitiphobia.

"The Shake (Part 1 - Body)" – 5:09
"Take the Sin" – 4:31
"Hypnotique" – 2:48
"Ancient" – 5:15
"Redemption Draweth Nigh" – 4:09
"Vivid" – 3:53
"Clean" – 3:16
"Go Prone" – 4:19
"The Shake (Part II - Brother)" – 4:51
"Enraptured" – 5:37
"Perfect Eyes" – 4:37
"Redemption" (K-otic Mix) – 4:19
"Perfect Eyes" (20/20 Mix) – 7:49

Personnel
Wally Shaw – vocals, keyboards, percussion
Sheri Shaw – keyboards, vocals
Michael Knott – guitars, vocals
Josh Plemon – guitars, percussion
Luke Mazerri – keyboards, sub enforcement
Monique Swaback – prayer on the song "Clean"
Darren Ford – engineering
Thom Roy – art direction
Bob Conlon – cover design
Jack Weddell - design and composites
Wayne Armstrong – photography

References 

1994 albums
Deitiphobia albums